Group A of the 2007 Copa América was one of the three groups of competing nations in the 2007 Copa América. It comprised Venezuela (the host nation), Bolivia, Peru, and Uruguay. Group play ran from 26 June to 3 July 2007.

Venezuela, Peru and Uruguay advanced from the group to the knockout phase.

Standings

Matches
All times are in local, Venezuela Time (UTC−04:00).

Uruguay v Peru

Venezuela v Bolivia

Bolivia v Uruguay

Venezuela v Peru

Peru v Bolivia

Venezuela v Uruguay

References

External links
2007 Copa América at RSSSF

Group A
2007 in Bolivian football
2007 in Peruvian football
Venezuela at the 2007 Copa América
2006–07 in Uruguayan football